Cesar Ramos may refer to:
César Ramos, Brazilian racing driver 
Cesar Ramos (actor)
Cesar Ramos (baseball)
César Ramos (boxer)
César Arturo Ramos (born 1983), Mexican referee